VNO-NCW (known in English as the "Confederation of Netherlands Industry and Employers") is a Dutch employers' federation founded in 1996 as a merger of the Christian-democratic Nederlands Christelijk Werkgeversverbond (NCW), which was founded as fusion of the Protestant PCW and the Catholic NKW, and the liberal Verbond van Nederlandse Ondernemingen (VNO). Both organizations had strong ties with the Protestant and liberal pillar, respectively.

The federation chose not to adopt a new name, but instead use the well-known acronyms of its constituent organizations.

Activities
The most important function of VNO-NCW is the CAO-talks, over wages and secondary working conditions, it holds with the trade unions. It also advises government via the Social Economic Council in which other employers' organizations, trade unions, and government-appointed experts also have seats.

List of chairmen of the Christian Employers' association

List of chairmen of the Industry and Employers' association

List of chairmen of the Industry and Employers confederation

Organization
VNO-NCW is the national employers' federation, it has 160 branch organizations as members, these organize 115,000 companies. This includes 80% of the smaller corporations and nearly all larger businesses.

The VNO-NCW has got a General Board and Board. The general board meets six times a year, and sets the general policy. The Board manages the daily operation of VNO-NCW. The current chair is Bernard Wientjes. The last chairs of the organization have been member of either the liberal VVD or the Christian-democratic CDA.

Several formally independent regional employers' associations, VNO-NCW North, VNO-NCW West, the Employers' Association of Brabant and Zeeland, and the Employers' Association of Limburg, cooperate with VNO-NCW.

The organization publishes Forum, its own magazine. AWVN is an advisory organization linked to VNO-NCW specialized in labour relations. De Baak is an educative institution for leadership, entrepreneurship and professionals who seek for inspiration, personal development, knowledge, and insights. Evolved from the largest employer’s organization in the Netherlands (the VNO-NCW – also known as "the voice" of Dutch business).

References

External links
website VNO-NCW in English

Trade associations based in the Netherlands
Economy of the Netherlands
Employers' organizations
1996 establishments in the Netherlands
Organizations established in 1996